Aashiqui 2 is the soundtrack to the 2013 Indian Hindi-language romantic musical drama film of the same name, directed by Mohit Suri and starring Aditya Roy Kapoor and Shraddha Kapoor in the lead roles. The album was produced by Bhushan Kumar and Mahesh Bhatt under the banner T-Series and Vishesh Films. The enormous success of multi composer setup has been followed in many films.

The songs of the film were mostly composed by Jeet Gannguli, although Mithoon and Ankit Tiwari composed two songs each (including both versions) as guest composers. Irshad Kamil wrote lyrics for most of songs on the album. Sandeep Nath wrote both versions of "Sunn Raha Hai", while Mithoon wrote "Tum Hi Ho" and Sanjay Masoom wrote "Bhula Dena". Arijit Singh sang six of the songs on the album. Jeet Gannguli reused the tune from his own Bengali composition "Mon Hariye Beghorey" for "Milne Hai Mujhse Aayi" and "Aaj Tomai Niye Shuru Holo Notun Jibon" for "Hum Maar Jayenge".

Creation 
 
The song Tum Hi Ho had already been recorded by Mithoon two years before its original release through Arijit's voice. The song became the most popular listener's choice song of the year 2013 and an ever-chanting love anthem for everyone.

The song "Sunn Raha Hai" was rendered in two different (electric rock and semi -classical) styles as per the demand of the film where a rich and popular singer sings with modern and sophisticated instruments and a poor bar singer sings with normal instruments. The composer Ankit Tiwari was appreciated for recruiting Shreya Ghoshal's voice for the female version of the song.

The song "Hum Mar Jayenge" uses flute, which Bollywood Hungama in their review appreciated."Chahun Main Yaa Na" is a "coming-up love" romantic song which not only remarked the two persons, composer Jeet Gannguli and singer Palak Muchhal who come into the limelight but also became quite contagious amongst the youngsters of those time. The song "Milne Hai Mujhse Aayi" has used guitars that lean towards heavy rock genre. The song "Aashan Nahi Yahaan" has a universal message of love in its lyrics. "Bhula Dena" depicted the practical ending of the two lovers but which would start once again in the coming births as their love was unknowingly infinite in its cause.

The whole album though was based on love except for the youth-appealing song "Sunn Raha Hai", the quality and freshness was splendidly unmatchable from other hit albums like Yeh Jawaani Hai Deewani, Chennai Express, Kai Po Che, Bhaag Milkha Bhaag, Phata Poster Nikla Hero, Raanjhanaa, Dhoom 3 and Goliyon Ki Raasleela Ram-Leela, of that year.

Critical reception
Aashiqui 2s soundtrack received acclaim  from music critics, who praised the songs "Tum Hi Ho" and both versions of "Sunn Raha Hai". The Times of India rated the album 5 out of 5 stars and wrote, "Aashiqui 2 tries, and succeeds to some extent in matching the repeat-values freshness and allure of the original. And while it is unfair to compare a sequel to the original, it needs to be said that each should be seen for its own merit."

Koimoi rated the album 3 out of 5 and said, "Aashiqui 2 is an album that had set its heart in the right place and wanted to accomplish what Aashiqui did musically. It has the ingredients in place though at times one gets an impression that the recipe could have been a tad better. One waits to see if the soundtrack would indeed turn out to be memorable for a lifetime, more so since Bhatts had musically created a high standard with Aashiqui."

Track listing

Awards and nominations

Additionals
A mashup was later released as a single on 29 May 2013.

References

External links
Aashiqui 2 (soundtrack) at the Internet Movie Database
iTunes

2013 soundtrack albums
Filmi soundtracks
Hindi film soundtracks
T-Series (company) soundtrack albums
Drama film soundtracks
Musical film soundtracks